Lee Richard Samuel Mansell (born 23 September 1982) is an English former professional footballer who played for Luton Town, Nuneaton Borough, Oxford United, Torquay United and Bristol Rovers. He was most recently the first team manager of National League North club Gloucester City.

Career
Mansell was born in Gloucester and began his career as a trainee with Luton Town, turning professional with the Hatters in August 2000. He made his first-team debut on 17 January 2001 in a 2–1 defeat away to Queens Park Rangers in an FA Cup 3rd Round Replay, with his league debut coming 6 days later in a 2–0 defeat away to Oldham Athletic.

He had a spell on loan with Nuneaton Borough in March 2003, scoring twice in five games. He returned to Luton, but was released at the end of the 2004–05 season, having scored 8 times in 47 league games. He moved to Oxford United in June 2005, and played 44 times the following season as Oxford were relegated to the Conference.

Torquay United

He was transferred to Torquay United, one of the sides to survive at Oxford's expense on the last day of the previous season, on 5 July 2006 for an undisclosed fee. He was a regular in Torquay's side in the 2006–07 season but, for a second season in a row, the side he played for was relegated to the Conference National.

Mansell was Torquay's captain, and most-capped player ahead of defender Chris Robertson. He was awarded the captaincy in 2010, after Nicky Wroe was dropped for inconsistency and subsequently moved to Shrewsbury Town on 31 January 2011.

Lee made an excellent start to the 2011–12 season, scoring on the opening day at Plainmoor to rescue a point against Burton Albion on 6 August 2011 before scoring again in a midweek League Cup tie against Southampton, netting Torquay's consolation in a 4–1 loss. 

Lee made 389 appearances in all competitions for Torquay United, placing him sixth on Torquay United all-time appearance list.

Bristol Rovers
On 26 June 2014 Lee signed a two-year deal at Bristol Rovers, turning down a one-year-deal with Torquay United.

Mansell made his competitive debut for Bristol Rovers in a goalless draw against Grimsby Town on 9 August 2014, Rovers' first game in the Conference Premier. He scored his first goal for the club on 16 August 2014, in a 2–1 defeat away against Altrincham. Despite a difficult start to the season, in which the club picked up just eight points from the first seven games, Rovers finished second behind Barnet by one point. After beating Forest Green Rovers in the semi-final, Rovers faced a repeat of their opening day fixture with Grimsby Town. Mansell scored the winning penalty in a 5–3 shootout victory at Wembley Stadium on 17 May 2015 as Bristol Rovers returned to the Football League after a one-season absence.

After scoring the winning penalty, the following season Lee went onto score 2 goals in 29 appearances as Bristol Rovers achieved a second successive promotion with a 92nd-minute winner scored by Lee Brown against Dagenham & Redbridge. On 14 June 2016 Lee signed a new deal to remain with the club.

Mansell's third season at the club saw him limited to just 10 appearances in all competitions. Manager Darrell Clarke revealed that Mansell would not be offered a new contract at the end of the season but would be offered the new role of Professional Development Phase Coach working within the club's academy, an offer Mansell indicated he would accept and confirmed his retirement from the professional game in an interview BBC Radio Bristol. After 4 seasons in this role, Mansell left Bristol Rovers at the end of the 2020–21 season.

Coaching career
On 25 September 2021, Mansell was appointed interim manager of National League North club Gloucester City following the sacking of Paul Groves. On 13 November, Mansell picked up his first win as manager as Bristol Rovers loanee Ollie Hulbert, whom had worked closely with Mansell in the Development Squad at Rovers, scored a double as Gloucester defeated Farsley Celtic 2–0. After the match, Mansell was given the job until the end of the 2021–22 season. Mansell was sacked by the club on 29 September 2022 with Gloucester sitting in 15th position after ten matches.

Honours
Individual
PFA Team of the Year: 2011–12 League Two
Conference Premier Team of the Year: 2014–15

References

External links

1982 births
Living people
Footballers from Gloucester
English footballers
Association football midfielders
Luton Town F.C. players
Nuneaton Borough F.C. players
Oxford United F.C. players
Torquay United F.C. players
Bristol Rovers F.C. players
English Football League players
National League (English football) players
Bristol Rovers F.C. non-playing staff
English football managers
Gloucester City A.F.C. managers
National League (English football) managers